Connecticut Post Mall (formerly known as Westfield Connecticut Post) is a shopping mall, located on the Boston Post Road (Route 1) in Milford, Connecticut. It is currently the largest mall in the state of Connecticut and is partially owned and operated by Centennial Properties.

History
The original, open-air mall was built by Sol Atlas and opened in 1960, anchored by a W. & J. Sloane furniture store and a Stop & Shop supermarket at opposite ends. In 1962, the sixth branch of the Alexander's department store chain opened. Following an early fire at the west end of the mall, a Caldor discount store was built as the new anchor.

In 1981, the mall was enclosed. The mall underwent a renovation in 1990, which added the Skyview Cafe food court, and lost anchor Alexander's. On August 7, 1991, JCPenney opened in the former Alexander's space. G. Fox was added in 1991 and was rebranded as Filene's in 1993. Caldor closed on May 15, 1999, and was later demolished. Stop & Shop relocated to a freestanding store sometime in the late 1990s and was demolished for Sears, which opened on April 1, 2000.

The Mall strongly opposed the proposed rival New Haven Galleria mall at Long Wharf, filing over 15 lawsuits.

A $118 million  expansion project  took place in 2005–06, adding:
 an additional level of parking
 a  third floor to Filene's which was later rebranded as Macy's in 2006.
 a large extension to the building with a  movie theater (Connecticut Post 14, replacing the Milford Fourplex, previously located in an adjacent building. Was Cinema De Lux, later a Rave Cinemas, now a Cinemark), a new food court, and two more anchors, Dick's Sporting Goods and Target on the site of the former Caldor.

In December 2015, Westfield sold Connecticut Post in a $1.1 billion deal involving 5 malls.

In 2017, it was announced Boscov's will replace JCPenney, which would close.

On October 15, 2018, it was announced that Sears would be closing as part of a plan to close 142 stores nationwide. The store closed on January 7, 2019.

On November 7, 2018, Dave & Buster's joined the mall. 

On May 13, 2019, it was announced that a Muse Paintbar would open.

On June 3, 2019, the Red Robin shuttered as part of a plan to close 10 restaurants nationwide.

On August 2, 2019, a Guacamole's Mexican restaurant opened.

On January 27, 2020, the Bar Louie shuttered as part of their Chapter 11 bankruptcy proceedings.

In 2020, the former Sears space was to be demolished for a new mixed-used development project called The Post. However, these were cancelled when the Milford P&Z Commission declined the proposed project to be built.

On May 20, 2021, it was announced that a Cast Iron restaurant would open in the former World of Beer space.

On August 3, 2022, it was announced that P.F. Chang's would open a new location in this mall in the former Bar Louie space, which will open in 2023.

On October 22, 2022, it was announced that Ulta Beauty would be relocating from the Connecticut Post Mall to a new location in Orange, in the former Talbots Outlet space. The new store will open in June 2023, with the Connecticut Post Mall location closing shortly after.

References

External links
Connecticut Post Mall website

Shopping malls in Connecticut
Buildings and structures in Milford, Connecticut
Shopping malls established in 1960
Tourist attractions in New Haven County, Connecticut
Shopping malls in the New York metropolitan area
1960 establishments in Connecticut